Evolved High Speed Packet Access, HSPA+, HSPA (Plus) or HSPAP, is a technical standard for wireless broadband telecommunication. It is the second phase of HSPA which has been introduced in 3GPP release 7 and being further improved in later 3GPP releases. HSPA+ can achieve data rates of up to 42.2 Mbit/s. It introduces antenna array technologies such as beamforming and multiple-input multiple-output communications (MIMO). Beam forming focuses the transmitted power of an antenna in a beam towards the user's direction. MIMO uses multiple antennas at the sending and receiving side. Further releases of the standard have introduced dual carrier operation, i.e. the simultaneous use of two 5 MHz carriers. HSPA+ is an evolution of HSPA that upgrades the existing 3G network and provides a method for telecom operators to migrate towards 4G speeds that are more comparable to the initially available speeds of newer LTE networks without deploying a new radio interface. HSPA+ should not be confused with LTE though, which uses an air interface based on orthogonal frequency-division modulation and multiple access.

Advanced HSPA+ is a further evolution of HSPA+ and provides data rates up to 84.4 and 168 Megabits per second (Mbit/s) to the mobile device (downlink) and 22 Mbit/s from the mobile device (uplink) under ideal signal conditions. Technically these are achieved through the use of a multiple-antenna technique known as MIMO (for "multiple-input and multiple-output") and higher order modulation (64QAM) or combining multiple cells into one with a technique known as Dual-Cell HSDPA.

Downlink

Evolved HSDPA (HSPA+) 

An Evolved HSDPA network can theoretically support up to 28 Mbit/s and 42 Mbit/s with a single 5 MHz carrier for Rel7 (MIMO with 16QAM) and Rel8 (64-QAM + MIMO), in good channel conditions with low correlation between transmit antennas.  Although real speeds are far lower. Besides the throughput gain from doubling the number of cells to be used, some diversity and joint scheduling gains can also be achieved. The QoS (Quality of Service) can be particularly improved for end users in poor radio reception where they cannot benefit from the other WCDMA capacity improvements (MIMO and higher order modulations) due to poor radio signal quality. In 3GPP a study item was completed in June 2008. The outcome can be found in technical report 25.825. An alternative method to double the data rates is to double the bandwidth to 10 MHz (i.e. 2×5 MHz) by using DC-HSDPA.

Dual-Carrier HSDPA (DC-HSDPA) 
Dual-Carrier HSDPA, also known as Dual-Cell HSDPA, is part of 3GPP Release 8 specification. It is the natural evolution of HSPA by means of carrier aggregation in the downlink. UMTS licenses are often issued as 5, 10, or 20 MHz paired spectrum allocations. The basic idea of the multicarrier feature is to achieve better resource utilization and spectrum efficiency by means of joint resource allocation and load balancing across the downlink carriers.

New HSDPA User Equipment categories 21-24 have been introduced that support DC-HSDPA. DC-HSDPA can support up to 42.2 Mbit/s, but unlike HSPA, it does not need to rely on MIMO transmission.

The support of MIMO in combination with DC-HSDPA will allow operators deploying Release 7 MIMO to benefit from the DC-HSDPA functionality as defined in Release 8. While in Release 8 DC-HSDPA can only operate on adjacent carriers, Release 9 also allows that the paired cells can operate on two different frequency bands. Later releases allow the use of up to four carriers simultaneously.

From Release 9 onwards it will be possible to use DC-HSDPA in combination with MIMO being used on both carriers. The support of MIMO in combination with DC-HSDPA will allow operators even more capacity improvements within their network. This will allow theoretical speed of up to 84.4 Mbit/s.

User Equipment (UE) Categories 
The following table is derived from table 5.1a of the release 11 of 3GPP TS 25.306 and shows maximum data rates of different device classes and by what combination of features they are achieved. The per-cell per-stream data rate is limited by the Maximum number of bits of an HS-DSCH transport block received within an HS-DSCH TTI and the Minimum inter-TTI interval. The TTI is 2 ms. So for example Cat 10 can decode 27,952 bits/2 ms = 13.976 Mbit/s (and not 14.4 Mbit/s as often claimed incorrectly). Categories 1-4 and 11 have inter-TTI intervals of 2 or 3, which reduces the maximum data rate by that factor. Dual-Cell and MIMO 2x2 each multiply the maximum data rate by 2, because multiple independent transport blocks are transmitted over different carriers or spatial streams, respectively. The data rates given in the table are rounded to one decimal point.

Notes:

Uplink

Dual-Carrier HSUPA (DC-HSUPA) 
Dual-Carrier HSUPA, also known as Dual-Cell HSUPA, is a wireless broadband standard based on HSPA that is defined in 3GPP UMTS release 9.
Dual Cell (DC-)HSUPA is the natural evolution of HSPA by means of carrier aggregation in the uplink.  UMTS licenses are often issued as 10 or 15 MHz paired spectrum allocations. The basic idea of the multicarrier feature is to achieve better resource utilization and spectrum efficiency by means of joint resource allocation and load balancing across the uplink carriers.

Similar enhancements as introduced with Dual-Cell HSDPA in the downlink for 3GPP Release 8 were standardized for the uplink in 3GPP Release 9, called Dual-Cell HSUPA. The standardisation of Release 9 was completed in December 2009.

User Equipment (UE) Categories 
The following table shows uplink speeds for the different categories of Evolved HSUPA.

Multi-carrier HSPA (MC-HSPA) 
The aggregation of more than two carriers has been studied and 3GPP Release 11 is scheduled to include 4-carrier HSPA. The standard was scheduled to be finalised in Q3 2012 and first chipsets supporting MC-HSPA in late 2013. Release 11 specifies 8-carrier HSPA allowed in non-contiguous bands with 4 × 4 MIMO offering peak transfer rates up to 

The 168 Mbit/s and 22 Mbit/s represent theoretical peak speeds. The actual speed for a user will be lower. In general, HSPA+ offers higher bitrates only in very good radio conditions (very close to the cell tower) or if the terminal and network both support either MIMO or Dual-Cell HSDPA, which effectively use two parallel transmit channels with different technical implementations.

The higher 168 Mbit/s speeds are achieved by using multiple carriers with Dual-Cell HSDPA and 4-way MIMO together simultaneously.

All-IP architecture 
A flattened all-IP architecture is an option for the network within HSPA+. In this architecture, the base stations connect to the network via IP (often Ethernet providing the transmission), bypassing legacy elements for the user's data connections. This makes the network faster and cheaper to deploy and operate. The legacy architecture is still permitted with the Evolved HSPA and is likely to exist for several years after adoption of the other aspects of HSPA+ (higher order modulation, multiple streams, etc.).

This 'flat architecture' connects the 'user plane' directly from the base station to the GGSN external gateway, using any available link technology supporting TCP/IP. The definition can be found in 3GPP TR25.999. The user's data flow bypasses the Radio Network Controller (RNC) and the SGSN of the previous 3GPP UMTS architecture versions, thus simplifying the architecture, reducing costs and delays. This is nearly identical to the 3GPP Long Term Evolution (LTE) flat architecture as defined in the 3GPP standard Rel-8. The changes allow cost effective modern link layer technologies such as xDSL or Ethernet, and these technologies are no longer tied to the more expensive and rigid requirements of the older standard of SONET/SDH and E1/T1 infrastructure.

There are no changes to the 'control plane'.

Nokia Siemens Networks Internet HSPA (I-HSPA) was the first commercial solution implementing the Evolved HSPA flattened all-IP architecture.

See also 
 Comparison of wireless data standards
 High Speed Packet Access
 List of UMTS networks

References

External links 
 3GPP Specifications Home Page
 ETSI GSM UMTS 3GPP Numbering Cross Reference
 HSPA LTE Link Budget Comparison
 Public HSPA Discussion Forum
 EDGE, HSPA & LTE
 QUALCOMM to Deliver 28 Mbps Mobile Broadband with HSPA+
 HSPA+ Upgrade in Sri Lanka 
 Sri Lanka; Local 28.8 Mbit/s downlink HSPA trial a 'success'
 HSPA+ Now “Officially” 4G According to ITU

3GPP standards
UMTS
Year of introduction missing